James Healey is an American politician, who was elected to the Nevada Assembly in the 2012 elections. A member of the Democratic Party, he represented the 35th Assembly District, which is based in the southwestern portion of the Las Vegas Valley, also known as Enterprise. Healey was defeated for reelection in 2014 by Republican businessman Brent Jones by a margin of 53-47%.

Healey is openly gay.

References

Gay politicians
LGBT state legislators in Nevada
Democratic Party members of the Nevada Assembly
Living people
People from the Las Vegas Valley
Year of birth missing (living people)